Light's bitterling (Rhodeus lighti) is a temperate freshwater fish belonging to the subfamily Acheilognathinae of the family Cyprinidae.  It originates in Russia and China, from the Amur River basin to southern China.  It was originally described as Pseudoperilampus lighti by H.W. Wu in 1931.

Named in honor of zoologist Sol Felty Light (1886-1947), University of California, for “constant help and encouragement” in Wu’s zoological studies during their three-year association at University of Amoy (now Xiamen University).

The fish reaches a length up to 5.2 cm (2.0 in), and is native to freshwater habitats with a temperature of 10 to 25 °C (50 to 77 °F). When spawning, the females deposit their eggs inside bivalves, where they hatch and the young remain until they can swim.

References 

Fish described in 1931
lighti